Tarache tenuicula is a species of bird dropping moth in the family Noctuidae. It is found in North America.

The MONA or Hodges number for Tarache tenuicula is 9135.

References

Further reading

 
 
 

Acontiinae
Articles created by Qbugbot
Moths described in 1875